AEW St. Patrick's Day Slam is an annual professional wrestling television special produced by the American promotion All Elite Wrestling (AEW). Established in 2021, the event airs in March as AEW's St. Patrick's Day television special. This special airs as part of the promotion's flagship weekly television program, AEW Dynamite. and AEW Rampage.

History
On March 10, 2021, All Elite Wrestling (AEW) announced that the March 17 episode of their flagship television program, Dynamite, would be a special episode titled St. Patrick's Day Slam. The St. Patrick's Day television special was taped on March 11 at Daily's Place in Jacksonville, Florida due to the ongoing COVID-19 pandemic.

On  March 13, 2022, it was confirmed that St. Patrick's Day Slam would return. The event took place on March 16, for the second year in a row the show was main evented by Britt Baker and Thunder Rosa for the AEW Women's World Championship.

In January 2023, it was confirmed that St. Patrick's Day Slam would return as a special episode of AEW Rampage on March 17, 2023.

Events

See also
List of All Elite Wrestling special events
List of AEW Dynamite special episodes
List of AEW Rampage episodes

References

External links

Saint Patrick's Day
Recurring events established in 2021
All Elite Wrestling shows